John F. Gillis (October 21, 1843 – January 23, 1899) was a physician and political figure in Prince Edward Island. He represented 5th Prince in the Legislative Assembly of Prince Edward Island from 1883 to 1890 as a Conservative member.

He was born in Miscouche, Prince Edward Island, the son of John P. Gillis, of Scottish descent. He was educated at St. Dunstan's College in Charlottetown and McGill College. Gillis set up practice in Summerside. In 1882, he married Regina Doyle.

Gillis died in Summerside at the age of 55.

References

External links 
The Canadian parliamentary companion, 1887 JA Gemmill

1843 births
1899 deaths
Progressive Conservative Party of Prince Edward Island MLAs
People from Prince County, Prince Edward Island
McGill University alumni